Pedaprolu is a village in Krishna district of the Indian state of Andhra Pradesh. It is located in Mopidevi mandal of Machilipatnam revenue division. It is a part of Andhra Pradesh Capital Region.

Transportation 

APSRTC Runs buses to Avanigadda, Ghantasala,  Mopidevi, Challapalli, Kuchipudi, Movva,  Gudivada, Pamarru, Machilipatnam through Pedaprolu village.

NH216, a main and major spur road of National Highway 16 (India) connects Ongole and kathipudi, passes through this village.

Nearest Railway stations 
Machilipatnam railway station (MTM), Repalle railway station (RAL), Vijayawada Junction railway station (BZA), Gudivada Junction railway station (GDV) are the nearest railway stations to this Pedaprolu village.

See also 
Villages in Mopidevi mandal

References 

Villages in Krishna district